The 2011–12 Nevada Wolf Pack men's basketball team represented the University of Nevada, Reno during the 2011–12 NCAA Division I men's basketball season. The Wolf Pack, led by third year head coach David Carter, played their home games at the Lawlor Events Center and were members of the Western Athletic Conference. They finished the season 28–7, 13–1 in WAC play to be crowned regular season. They lost to Louisiana Tech in the semifinals of the WAC Basketball tournament. As regular season conference champions, they received an automatic bid into the 2012 National Invitation Tournament where they defeated Oral Roberts in the first round and Bucknell in the second round before falling in the quarterfinals to Stanford.

This was Nevada's final year as a member of the WAC as they will join the Mountain West Conference in July 2012.

Roster

Schedule

|-
!colspan=9| Exhibition

|-
!colspan=9| Regular season

|-
!colspan=9| 2012 WAC men's basketball tournament

|-
!colspan=9| 2012 NIT

References

Nevada Wolf Pack men's basketball seasons
Nevada
Nevada
Nevada Wolf Pack
Nevada Wolf Pack